Scopula ordinaria is a moth of the family Geometridae. It was described by Harrison Gray Dyar Jr. in 1912. It is endemic to Mexico.

References

Moths described in 1912
ordinaria
Endemic Lepidoptera of Mexico
Moths of Central America